Phylloxiphia karschi is a moth of the family Sphingidae. It is known from Cameroon, Gabon, Democratic Republic of the Congo and Uganda.

References

Phylloxiphia
Moths described in 1903
Insects of Cameroon
Insects of the Democratic Republic of the Congo
Fauna of Gabon
Moths of Africa